Anthony Tyrone Evans, Jr. (born July 14, 1978) is an American Christian singer and songwriter. Evans has made six studio albums during his career as a musician: Even More in 2004 with Epic Records, Letting Go in 2006 with Integrity Music, The Bridge in 2006 with EMI Gospel, Undisguised in 2010 with INO Records, Home in 2011 with Fair Trade Services, and Real Life/Real Worship in 2014 with Fair Trade Services.

In 2012, Evans made it onto The Voice during season two on Team Aguilera, but was eliminated after the battle rounds on March 5, 2012.

Background
Evans was born on July 14, 1978, in Dallas, Texas. He is the son of Dr. Tony Evans and Lois Evans. His father, a Christian radio personality, is senior pastor at the megachurch Oak Cliff Bible Fellowship in Dallas. He has one brother – Jonathan – and two sisters: Chrystal and Priscilla, the latter a best-selling author. Evans graduated from Liberty University. Evans starred in Caged No More, a Christian faith-based film about sex trafficking.
In 2018 he performed live at the Independence Day reception of the U.S. Embassy Berlin in Germany.

Music career
On June 8, 2004, Evans released his debut studio album entitled Even More with the record label Epic Records. The follow-up second studio album was released on March 7, 2006, titled Letting Go with Integrity Music. His third studio album would come out on June 10, 2008, entitled The Bridge that was released under the EMI Gospel label. On October 2, 2009, Evans released his first ever Holiday album with INO called What Christmas Means. The fourth studio album by Evans was titled Undisguised, which came out on January 26, 2010, with INO Records that later became Fair Trade Services. Evans released his fifth studio album on November 15, 2011, titled Home through Fair Trade Services.

The Voice
Evans appeared on the second season of NBC's The Voice. In the blind audition broadcast on February 20, 2012, he sang "What's Going On" from Marvin Gaye. Only Christina Aguilera turned her chair during the blind audition, with the other three (Adam Levine, CeeLo Green and Blake Shelton) abstaining. On Team Aguilera as a default, he was put in the Battles round against another Aguilera contestant, Jesse Campbell. On an episode broadcast on March 5, they both sang the Alicia Keys song "If I Ain't Got You", with Aguilera opting to keep Campbell after an epic musical confrontation. The show hadn't installed the "steal option" for other judges yet, so Evans was eliminated from the show.

Real Life/Real Worship
After The Voice, Evans released his sixth studio album on April 8, 2014, called Real Life/Real Worship with Fair Trade Services. It proved to be commercially his most successful album release. The album charted on the Billboard on the week of April 26, 2014, at number 60 most sold album in all the United States by the Billboard Hot 200. The album made it also to number 4 on the Top Christian Album chart the same week. In addition, the album reached number 2 on the most sold Top Gospel Albums chart.

Discography

Studio albums

Holiday albums

References

External links
 

1978 births
Living people
American performers of Christian music
Fair Trade Services artists
Musicians from Dallas
Songwriters from Texas
The Voice (franchise) contestants